Annerod is a small village, part of the municipality Fernwald, in Germany between Gießen and Großen-Buseck approximately 70 km north of Frankfurt.
Annerod has a population of about 2800 people.

Villages in Hesse
Giessen (district)